Dianthus bicolor, the bicolour pink, is a species of flowering plant in the family Caryophyllaceae, native to Ukraine, south European Russia, the northern Caucasus, and Kazakhstan. It is found growing in a wide variety of habitats, including forests, grasslands, cliffs, and mountain peaks.

References

bicolor
Flora of Ukraine
Flora of South European Russia
Flora of the North Caucasus
Flora of Kazakhstan
Plants described in 1805